is a kind of trial by ordeal that was conducted in ancient Japan. It was done through exposure to boiling water and it is believed innocent people would not be scalded and guilty people would be scalded due to divine intervention by kami.

See also 
 Trial by ordeal
 Trial by fire (law)
 Bocca della Verità

Footnotes 

Shinto and society